The following highways are numbered 245:

Canada
 Manitoba Provincial Road 245
 Nova Scotia Route 245
 Prince Edward Island Route 245
 Quebec Route 245

Costa Rica
 National Route 245

Japan
 Japan National Route 245

United States
 Alabama State Route 245
 Arkansas Highway 245
 California State Route 245
 Florida State Road 245 (former)
 Georgia State Route 245 (former)
 Indiana State Road 245
 K-245 (Kansas highway)
 Kentucky Route 245
 Maryland Route 245
 Mississippi Highway 245
 Missouri Route 245
 Montana Secondary Highway 245
 New Mexico State Road 245
 New York State Route 245
 Ohio State Route 245
 Oregon Route 245
 Pennsylvania Route 245 (former)
 South Carolina Highway 245
 South Dakota Highway 245 (former)
 Tennessee State Route 245
 Texas State Highway 245 (former)
 Texas State Highway Spur 245
 Farm to Market Road 245 (Texas)
 Utah State Route 245 (former)
 Virginia State Route 245

See also
 List of highways numbered 246
 List of highways numbered 244